KIZS is an American radio station broadcasting at a frequency of 101.5 MHz in Tulsa, Oklahoma. Owned and operated by iHeartMedia, the station plays a Regional Mexican format. Its studios are located at the Tulsa Event Center in Southeast Tulsa and its transmitter site is in Owasso.

History
Before September 2005, the KIZS call letters were on the 92.1 frequency, broadcasting the KISS-FM brand of Top 40 programmed by other Clear Channel Communications-owned stations. Despite carrying the "KISSFM" brand name, KIZS was not always a Top 40 station. When 92-1 KISSFM launched, it was a Mainstream Top 40 station, competing with 106.9 KHITS. However, that format was not working in terms of ratings or revenue and the format was tweaked to an adult-leaning Top 40, described by some as a "90s and Now" Hot AC. After a year in this format and with the station still not garnering the success that Clear Channel would have liked, the format was once again tweaked, this time back toward Mainstream Top 40 in mid-2004, again with limited success.

On September 23, 2005 KTBT moved from its 101.5 frequency to the much stronger 92.1 frequency in order to better compete with 106.9 KHITS. The format on the 101.5 frequency was then adjusted to the station Clear Channel Communications's current configuration, the "La Preciosia" brand featuring Spanish oldies.

KIZS is licensed by the FCC to broadcast in the HD hybrid format.

Translators

External links
101.5 El Patrón website

References

IZS
Radio stations established in 2005
IHeartMedia radio stations